Darisodes is a genus of moths in the family Geometridae. It was first described by Claude Herbulot in 1972.

Species
Some species of this genus are:

Darisodes cuneata Herbulot, 1972
Darisodes oritropha (D. S. Fletcher, 1958)
Darisodes orygaria (Guenée, 1862)

References

Ennominae